Kalicludine (AsKC) is a blocker of the voltage-dependent potassium channel Kv1.2 found in the snakeslocks anemone Anemonia viridis (Anemonia sulcata), which it uses to paralyse prey.



Etymology

“Kali”, abbreviated from the Latin word “kalium”, equals potassium. “Cludine” means to block or to enclose, as it is derived from the Latin verb “cludere”.

Source, family and homology

Kalicludine (uniprot ID: Q9TWG0) is also known as KappaPI-actitoxin-Avd3b or as Kunitz-type serine protease inhibitor kalicludine-1. Thus, kalicludines are part of the Kunitz-type inhibitor superfamily. The Kunitz-type scaffold is found both in inhibitors of proteolytic enzymes and in toxins. Other members of this superfamily are the pancreatic trypsin inhibitors (BPTI), which are potent Kunitz-type protease inhibitors, and dendrotoxins. Kalicludine has 40% homology with BPTIs. The most represented sequences of this group corresponds with kalicludine-3 and kalicludine-4, a recently found polypeptide.

A. sulcata kalicludines include AsKC1, AsKC2, and AsKC3., which are related to Bunodosoma granulifera toxin k (BgK) and Stichodactyla helianthus toxin k (ShK). A different, less abundant, protein is AsKC1a, which has a supplementary residue at the C-terminus when compared with kalicludine-1. Furthermore, a level of amino acid sequence identity and similarity of ≥43% and ≥50% was found between both A. sulcata Kunitz-type protease inhibitors SA5 II, SA5 III and AsKC1 – AsKC15.

Kalicludine has 48% identity with the amyloid A4 homologue, which is implicated in Alzheimer’s disease.

Structure
The kalicludine isotoxins have similar molecular size and a similar biological function.  They contain three amino acid residues that are important for trypsin binding: Lys-15, Ala-16, and Ile-19 in BPTI. AsKCs have a replacement at position 19 (Ile → Pro), which results in less inhibitory action than BPTI.

Mode of action
Kalicludine is stored in nematocysts or located in extracellular regions. It is known to be a dual-function toxin, able to inhibit both the serine protease trypsin (Kd=30 nM) and the voltage-gated potassium channels Kv1.2/KCNA2 (IC50=2800 nM). Kalicludines and dendrotoxins compete for binding to these Kv channels.

The kalicludine sequence is homologous to the sequence of dendrotoxins, in particular DTX 1 (dendrotoxin 1), potent blockers of Kv channels. Kalicludines have from 38 to 42% homologies with DTX. Both kalicludines and dendrotoxins increase the release of acetylcholine and enhance the duration of action potentials (AP).

Toxicity and symptoms
Kv channel blocking dendrotoxins, and thus possibly also kalicludines, often lead to overstimulation of the cholinergic system, and subsequently to neuromuscular block and cardiovascular depression.

References

Ion channel toxins
Neurotoxins